The Latin Grammy Award for Best Pop Song is an honor presented annually at the Latin Grammy Awards, a ceremony that recognizes excellence and promotes a wider awareness of cultural diversity and contributions of Latin recording artists in the United States and internationally. According to the Latin Grammy category description guide it is designed for new songs that contain 51% of the lyrics in Spanish and it is awarded to the songwriter(s).

It was introduced in 2019 at the 20th Annual Latin Grammy Awards. Colombian singer Camilo is the only composer to received the award for than once with two consecutive wins.

Recipients

2010s

2020s

See also 
 Billboard Latin Music Award for Latin Pop Song of the Year
 Lo Nuestro Award for Best Pop Song of the Year

References

External links 

 Official website of the Latin Grammy Awards

 
Song awards
Awards established in 2019
Pop Song
Songwriting awards